The Johannes Kepler University Linz (German: Johannes Kepler Universität Linz, short: JKU) is a public institution of higher education in Austria. It is located in Linz, the capital of Upper Austria. It offers bachelor's, master's, diploma and doctoral degrees in business, engineering, law, science, social sciences and medicine.

Today, 19,930 students study at the park campus in the northeast of Linz, with one out of nine students being from abroad. The university was the first in Austria to introduce an electronic student ID in 1998.

The university is the home of the Johann Radon Institute for Computational and Applied Mathematics (RICAM) of the Austrian Academy of Sciences.

In 2012, the Times Higher Education ranked the JKU at # 41 and in 2015 at # 87 in its list of the top 100 universities under 50 years old. According to the 2012 ranking, the JKU was the fifth best young university in German-speaking Europe. The university attained high scores for quotations, third-party funding, and internationalization efforts.

History 
The JKU was established as the "College of Social Sciences, Economics and Business" (Hochschule für Sozial- und Wirtschaftswissenschaften) in 1966. The Faculty of Sciences and Engineering was established three years later and in 1975, the college was awarded university status and the Faculty of Law was integrated on campus. The university was named in honor of astronomer Johannes Kepler (1571-1630) who wrote his magnum opus harmonices mundi ("The Harmony of the world") in Linz during the early 17th century and taught mathematics at a school for the landed gentry (Adelichen Landt-Schuelen) near Linz. At present, the campus added the "JKU Science Park", additional buildings for science and engineering institutes. In 2019 many new buildings are being built.

Campus 
JKU's campus is located in the northeast of Linz, in the Auhof area of the St. Magdalena district. The university buildings are placed in a 90-acre (364,000 m²) park centered around a pond.

Infrastructure 
The campus is accessible by the Linz tram lines 1 and 2 and the express bus line 77. On weekdays, trams travel every 5 minutes and a trip to the city center (Hauptplatz) takes approximately 16 minutes.

The JKU is also located close to Austria's autobahn network at theDornach exit on the A7 Mühlkreisautobahn (ca. 1 km or 0.6 miles).  In anticipation of extending the campus, an additional autobahn exit, Auhof, is currently in the construction stages and is expected to better facilitate traffic, allowing a more direct route to the university.

A bicycle path in the north-east corner of the town located along the north side of the Danube river provides direct access to the university and helps to reduce traffic in the area.

Housing 
Many larger dormitories are within walking distance of the university, such as the Julius Raab Heim, the WIST Haus, the Kepler Heim, the ESH and the KHG Heim. Several other dormitories are located in different parts of Linz, providing housing for more than 3,100 students in all of Linz.

Some of the dormitories become hotels during the summer holidays, most notably the Julius Raab Heim under the name Hotel Sommerhaus.

Organization

Management 
The university Rector and Academic Senate are responsible for the university's management.  There are several vice rectors who are each assigned to specific task areas and who assist the Rector. The university board is an independent body that advises and counsels the Rector and Academic Senate on management issues. Deans and faculty committees are responsible for management on a faculty level. Rector and deans are elected for a 4-year period whereas faculty committees are elected for a 2-year period.

Faculties and Degree Programs
The Johannes Kepler University has four faculties with a total of 127 institutes.

Faculty of Social Sciences, Economics and Business (SoWi) 
The Faculty of Social Sciences, Economics and Business is the oldest and largest faculty in terms of students and graduates. The faculty consists of 32 institutes and offers academic degrees e.g. in Economics and Business Administration, Business Informatics, Business and Education, Social Economics, Sociology and Statistics.

The faculty's abbreviation SoWi is derived from the German name of the faculty, Sozial- und Wirtschaftswissenschaftliche Fakultät.

Faculty of Engineering and Natural Sciences (TN) 
The Faculty of Engineering and Natural Sciences was established in 1969 and initially offered degrees e.g. in Technical Mathematics, Computer Science and Technical Physics. Over time, degrees in Technical Chemistry, Mechatronics and Information Electronics were introduced.

Several master's degrees to specialize in the area of computer science, mathematics and physics, such as pervasive computing, industrial mathematics or biophysics are available. Doctorate degrees are offered in the areas of natural science and technical science.

The TN faculty consists of 51 distinctive institutes and the German name is Technisch-Naturwissenschaftliche Fakultät, hence the abbreviation TN or TNF.

Faculty of Law (RE) 
The Faculty of Law was officially established in 1975. Before that time period, law degrees were offered by the SoWi faculty, which was then theFaculty of Social Sciences, Economics, Business and Law. In addition to Diploma and doctorate degrees in law, the RE faculty offers a Bachelor's degree in Business Law in cooperation with the SoWi faculty. Law degrees are also offered via multimedia distance learning.

The abbreviation RE is derived from the first two letters of the faculty's name German name, Rechtswissenschaftliche Fakultät. At present, the RE faculty consists of 20 institutes.

Faculty of Medicine (MED) 
The Faculty of Medicine was founded in 2014. A new MED-Campus is being built.

Interdisciplinary programs 
The master's degree program in web sciences is divided into branches of study:
social web, web art & design, web business & economy, web engineering as well as
web and the law. It offers those with academic background in various fields a research-led expansion and in-depth look at fields relevant to the web such as technology, business, law, society, art and culture.

Distance learning 
The JKU maintains several distance learning centers in Austria that offer degrees and courses at the German FernUniversität Hagen, the British Open University and JKU's own distance law degree program.

Other universities in Linz 
There are three other universities in Linz: The University of Art and Design Linz, a public university for arts and industrial design (ca. 800 students), the Anton Bruckner Private University with approx. 1000 students enrolled, and the Catholic Private University Linz with about 500 students, which has been a Papal faculty since 1978.

Notes and references

See also 

 List of early modern universities in Europe

External links 
 Official JKU website 
Information for prospective international students (in English)
 Information about JKU from a former student (in English)

Dormitories 
 Julius Raab Heim
 WIST Haus
 Kepler Heim
 Evangelisches Studentenheim Linz (esh)
 Katholische Hochschulgemeinde Linz (KHG)
 Hotel Sommerhaus (Julius Raab Heim)

Related 
 Johann Radon Institute for Computational and Applied Mathematics (in English)
 Study in Austria: A Guide

 
Educational institutions established in 1966
Buildings and structures in Linz
Johannes Kepler
Education in Upper Austria
1966 establishments in Austria